Gideon Meitlis (1941–2001) was an Israeli footballer.

Gideon Meitlis played for Maccabi Netanya for ten years.

In 2007, he was honored posthumously by Maccabi Netanya. His daughter received the cup in his honor.

References

2001 deaths
Israeli Jews
Jewish footballers
Israeli footballers
Maccabi Netanya F.C. players
Association footballers not categorized by position
1941 births